Wood nymph is another term for a dryad in Ancient Greek mythology.

The term has also been applied to various animals:
 Woodnymphs (Thalurania, a hummingbird genus from tropical America)
 Cercyonis (North American wood-nymphs, a brush-footed butterfly genus)
 in particular the common wood-nymph (C. pegala)
 Ideopsis (Southeast Asian tree- and wood-nymphs, also known as glassy tigers, a brush-footed butterfly genus not closely related to Cercyonis)
 in particular Ideopsis juventa

Other
The Wood Nymph, 1894 tone poem by Jean Sibelius
The Wood Nymph (film), 1916 lost film by D. W. Griffith (as Granville Warwick)

Animal common name disambiguation pages